Dimerandra, abbreviated Dmd. in the horticultural trade, is a genus of flowering plants from the orchid family, Orchidaceae. The group is found across tropical America: southern Mexico (as far north as Veracruz), Central America, the West Indies and northern South America.

Species 
Kew, in its World Checklist of Selected Plant Families, has accepted 8 species in this genus:

 Dmd. buenaventurae Kraenzl. Siegerist (1986) - Colombia
 Dmd. carnosiflora  Siegerist (1986) - Brazil, Peru
 Dmd. elegans  (Focke) Siegerist (1986) - Costa Rica, Panama, Colombia, Venezuela, northern Brazil, Trinidad, Suriname, Guyana, French Guinea 
 Dmd. emarginata  (G.Mey.) Hoehne (1934) 2n = 40 - southern Mexico, Central America, Trinidad, northern South America
 Dmd. latipetala  Siegerist (1986) - Colombia, Central America
 Dmd. rimbachii  (Schltr.) Schltr. (1922) - Ecuador
 Dmd. stenopetala  (Hook.) Schltr. (1922) 2n = 40 - Jamaica, Trinidad, northern South America
 Dmd. tarapotana  Dodson & D.E.Benn. (1989) - Peru

See also 
 List of Orchidaceae genera

References and external links 

 Pridgeon, A.M., Cribb, P.J., Chase, M.A. & Rasmussen, F. eds. (1999). Genera Orchidacearum 1. Oxford Univ. Press.
 Pridgeon, A.M., Cribb, P.J., Chase, M.A. & Rasmussen, F. eds. (2001). Genera Orchidacearum 2. Oxford Univ. Press.
 Pridgeon, A.M., Cribb, P.J., Chase, M.A. & Rasmussen, F. eds. (2003). Genera Orchidacearum 3. Oxford Univ. Press
 Berg Pana, H. 2005. Handbuch der Orchideen-Namen. Dictionary of Orchid Names. Dizionario dei nomi delle orchidee. Ulmer, Stuttgart

Laeliinae genera
Laeliinae